Mark One may refer to:

 MK One, fashion retailer, formerly known as Mark One
 MRK1, musician
 Mark One Foods, makers of Candwich

See also
Mark I (disambiguation)